Barry Sloane (born Barry Paul Sloan; 10 February 1981) is an English actor. He has appeared in numerous television shows, and in the BAFTA Award–winning television films Pleasureland and The Mark of Cain. In 2006, Sloane made his West End debut in Willy Russell's Blood Brothers. In December 2007, he began playing serial killer Niall Rafferty in Channel 4's Hollyoaks, which earned him three award nominations. He is best known for providing the voice and motion capture of Captain Price from Call of Duty: Modern Warfare (2019) and Call of Duty: Modern Warfare II (2022).

In 2010, Sloane appeared in the ITV crime series DCI Banks and later that year, he also played Kieran Callaghan in the BBC One serial medical drama Holby City. In July 2012, Sloane was cast as Aiden Mathis in the ABC drama series Revenge. In February 2014, he joined the cast of ABC's science fiction drama series The Whispers. Sloane portrayed Captain Price in Call of Duty: Modern Warfare, a reboot of the original Modern Warfare games and received a BAFTA Award for Performer in a Leading Role nomination for his work.

Early life
Sloane was born Barry Paul Sloan in Liverpool. He was trained as a musician and actor before landing his first professional acting role as Ivan in the film In His Life: The John Lennon Story.

Career
In mid-2009, Sloane appeared as Troy Whitworth in Jez Butterworth's critically acclaimed play Jerusalem at London's Royal Court Theatre. The play was given a West End transfer in January 2010. After a record-breaking sellout run, it was announced that the play would transfer, this time to Broadway. He made his Broadway debut in Jerusalem at the Music Box Theatre in New York City on 4 February 2011.

Sloane starred in Joseph Ruben's 2013 thriller film Penthouse North alongside Michael Keaton and Michelle Monaghan.

On 10 July 2012, Sloane joined the cast of the ABC drama series Revenge as Aiden Mathis, a mysterious man with ties to Emily Thorne's past. It was announced on 23 October 2012 that he had been promoted to series regular. On 20 February 2014, it was reported that Sloane had been cast as Wes Lawrence in the ABC alien drama series The Whispers. Sloane continued his role as Zach on Longmire for the 6th, and last, season in 2017.

Personal life
Sloane married Katy O'Grady, the fourth-place runner-up of the third series of the Sky One programme Project Catwalk. They have a daughter, Gracie Bluebell Sloane, born in 2010 and a son, Lennon Michael Sloane, born in 2016.

Filmography

Theatre

References

External links
 
 

1981 births
20th-century English male actors
21st-century English male actors
English male film actors
English male soap opera actors
English male stage actors
Living people
Male actors from Liverpool